Mark Saunders (born 23 July 1971 in Reading) is an English professional footballer, who plays for, and is assistant manager for, Exmouth Town. He previously played for Plymouth Argyle and Gillingham and made nearly 250 Football League appearances in an 11-year career.

Saunders was appointed as Tiverton Town's assistant manager in June 2010. and took over as manager in November 2010.

In July 2013 Saunders became player/assistant manager at Exmouth Town.

References

1971 births
English footballers
Living people
Gillingham F.C. players
Plymouth Argyle F.C. players
Tiverton Town F.C. players
Sportspeople from Reading, Berkshire
Maidstone United F.C. players
Folkestone Invicta F.C. players
Tiverton Town F.C. managers
Association football midfielders
English football managers
Footballers from Berkshire